Jean-Marie Radoux (born 3 February 1906, date of death unknown) was a Belgian fencer. He competed in the individual and team épée events at the 1948 Summer Olympics.

References

External links
 

1906 births
Year of death missing
People from Marchiennes
Belgian male fencers
Belgian épée fencers
Olympic fencers of Belgium
Fencers at the 1948 Summer Olympics
Sportspeople from Nord (French department)